Pence is a plural of penny, a coin or unit of currency.

Pence may also refer to:

Places in the United States 
 Pence, Alabama, an unincorporated community
 Pence, Indiana, an unincorporated community
 Pence, Kansas, an unincorporated community
 Pence, Lewis County, Kentucky, an unincorporated community
 Pence, Wolfe County, Kentucky, an unincorporated community
 Pence, Wisconsin, a town
 Pence (CDP), Wisconsin, a census-designated place within the town

People
 Pence (surname), a list of people
 Mike Pence (born 1959), 48th vice president of the United States from 2017–21
 Pence Dacus (1931–2019), American football player and coach

Other uses
 Pence (Kingdom Hearts), a video game character
 Pence Opera House, an opera house and later, a mission

See also 
 
 Peter's Pence, a practice in the Roman Catholic Church
 Penny (disambiguation), including that of "pennies"
 Pense (disambiguation)